The Earldom of St Albans was created twice in the 17th century, first to Richard Bourke, Earl of Clanricarde then to Henry Jermyn, Baron Jermyn. It became extinct after the latter's death.

Earls of St Albans, First Creation (1628)
Richard Burke, 4th Earl of Clanricarde (c. 1572–1635)
Ulick Burke, 1st Marquess of Clanricarde (1604–1657) (extinct)

Earls of St Albans, Second Creation (1660)
Henry Jermyn, 1st Earl of St Albans (d. 1684)

See also
Duke of St Albans
Earl of Clanricarde
Earl of Verulam
Viscount St Albans

References

Extinct earldoms in the Peerage of England
Noble titles created in 1628
Noble titles created in 1660